The Fokker M.7 was a German observation aircraft of World War I, used by the armed forces of both Germany and Austro-Hungary.

Design and development

Twenty aircraft, powered by  Oberursel U.0 rotary engines, were built, some of which were used by Kaiserliche Marine (Imperial German Navy) shore stations.  It was a single-bay sesquiplane (biplane) of conventional configuration, with slightly staggered wings using wing warping for roll control, tandem open cockpits and Fokker's distinctive comma-shaped rudder.

The W.3 / W.4 was a floatplane version of the M.7.

Operational history

The aircraft was operated by the Austro-Hungarian forces under the designation Type B.I, following the German Empire's lettered prefixes from the Idflieg aircraft designation system.

Variants
 M.7 : Two-seat reconnaissance aircraft version.
 W.3 : Possible misidentification of the W.4
 W.4 : Two-seat reconnaissance floatplane version.

=

Imperial and Royal Aviation Troops

Specifications (M.7)

See also

Notes

References

 
 

1910s German military reconnaissance aircraft
M.7
Sesquiplanes
Single-engined tractor aircraft
Rotary-engined aircraft
Aircraft first flown in 1915